Brunia fumidisca is a moth of the family Erebidae. It was described by George Hampson in 1894. The species was described from the Indian state of Sikkim and is also found in Myanmar.

References

Lithosiina
Moths described in 1894